was a Japanese daimyō (feudal lord) who controlled the Province of Kai, and fought in a number of battles of the Sengoku period. 
He was the father of the famous Takeda Shingen.

Biography
Nobutora’s son was Harunobu, later known as Takeda Shingen, along with two other sons, Nobushige and Nobukado.

Nobutora defeated Imagawa Ujichika in 1521 at the Battle of Iidagawara, Hōjō Ujitsuna in 1526 at the Battle of Nashinokidaira, Suwa Yorishige in the 1531 at Battle of Shiokawa no gawara, and Hiraga Genshin in the 1536 at  Battle of Un no Kuchi  with the aid of his son Shingen. 
During that battle, Nobutora was forced to retreat, but his son Harunobu turned around, defeated Hiraga and took the castle.

Nobutora nevertheless wished to pass on his domain to Nobushige, and so in 1540, Harunobu overthrew his father and exiled him to Suruga. Nobutora didn't return to Kai until the death of Shingen in 1573, at the invitation of his grandson Katsuyori. At that time Nobutora was in his 80s, though some reported that even as an old man he still managed to strike fear to people around him.

Nobutora died on March 27, 1574 and was buried at the Daisenji temple in Kofu, Yamanashi.

Family
Father: Takeda Nobutsuna (1471-1507)
Sons:
 Takematsu (1517-1523)
 Takeda Shingen
 Inuchiyo (1523-1529)
 Takeda Nobushige
 Takeda Nobumoto
 Takeda Nobukado
 Matsuo Nobukore (1530-1571)
 Takeda Souchi
 Takeda Nobuzane
 Ichijo Nobutatsu
 Daughters:
 Joukei-in (1519-1550) married Imagawa Yoshimoto
 Nanshou-in (1520-?) married Anayama Nobutomo
 Nene (1528-1543) married Suwa Yorishige

Nobutora's Character

 According to the Kōyō Gunkan, completed in the Edo period, he was coarse and arrogant.

Soza Samonji sword
Nobutora was also a previous owner of a famous sword named "Soza Samonji" (宗三左文字), although he gave that sword to Imagawa Yoshimoto as a gift to secure an alliance. After Yoshimoto's death at the Okehazama, the sword came into possession of Oda Nobunaga. After the Incident of Honnoji, Toyotomi Hideyoshi recovered the sword, which he later gave to Tokugawa Ieyasu as a gift. The sword is currently a Cultural Properties of Japan.

References 

1493 births
1574 deaths
Samurai
Takeda clan